Moana Maree Maniapoto  (born 22 June 1961) is a New Zealand singer, songwriter and documentary maker. Widely considered one of New Zealand's most successful indigenous acts, her music is described as a fusion of traditional Māori haka, chants and taonga puoro, with contemporary soul, reggae and classical styles. Moana was briefly married to New Zealand politician and radio personality Willie Jackson, during which time she was known as Moana Maniapoto-Jackson; they divorced in 2001.
In 2016, Moana was inducted into the New Zealand Music Hall of Fame.

Early life
Maniapoto was born in Invercargill, New Zealand, and attended St Joseph's Māori Girls' College in Napier. She completed her secondary school education at McKillop College, Rotorua. She is said to have paid her way through Auckland law school by singing covers in the highly competitive Auckland club circuit. Maniapoto was raised Roman Catholic, with her cousin Max Mariu being the first Māori bishop. However during her college years Maniapoto began to question her Catholic beliefs, and abandoned them entirely after the birth of her children. She now considers herself a follower of traditional Māori spirituality.

Career

1986-1998: Moana and the Moahunters
In 1986, Moana debuted as a solo artist and released "Kua Makona" as a part of a campaign for the Alcohol Advisory Council of New Zealand. The song was produced by Maui Dalvanius Prime and peaked at number 27 on the RIANZ singles chart. In 1989, Moana formed Moana and the Moahunters with Teremoana Rapley and Mina Ripia.

In 1990, Moana and the Moahunters released "Black Pearl" which peaked at number 2 on the national charts in 1991, earning Moana her first gold.

In 1991, Moana and the Moahunters released "AEIOU (Akona Te Reo)", which combined rap with traditional Māori song. The lyrics of the single urged Māori youth to work to preserve their culture and traditions, learn about their history, and for all New Zealanders to learn the Māori language. The song was nominated for several awards in 1991. The band released their debut album Tahi in August 1993.

The band's second album, Rua, combined pop, hip-hop and Māori music. The songs on the album dealt with themes such as spirituality and prophecy, and the album cover used traditional Māori symbols. Other songs discussed colonial issues, such as the Treaty of Waitangi, signed between the Māori people and the British government in the 1840s. The group scored a gold record in New Zealand and a hit single. Moana retired the group after performing at the 1998 Vancouver Folk Festival.

Promotion of Māori culture

Moana and the Moa Hunters were well known for pioneering a distinctively Māori form of popular music, during a period when Māori language and culture was not as widely accepted or promoted as today. The band had a significant influence due to their style and message to the public. Besides their music, the group was well-known for their use of the traditional Māori haka. During concerts they projected images behind them related to the Māori people, such as the New Zealand landscape or traditional Māori Ta Moko tattooing.

Although they rap mostly in English, as most Māori youth did not speak much Māori in the early 1990s, the group's lyrics emphasise the necessity of studying their history and culture. When the group received a New Zealand Music Industry award in 1992, they accused the New Zealand radio of racism against Māori groups, whose music was categorised as "underground" and refused airtime by DJs.

2002–present: Moana and the Tribe

In 2002, Moana formed the band Moana and the Tribe which consisted of a large group of musicians and performers with a passion for Māori culture. Since their formation, the band has become one of the most successful indigenous bands to emerge from New Zealand.

In May 2008, Moana released Wha. She toured in 2008 and 2009 Germany, Australia, Netherlands, Turkey, New Zealand and performed at the opening of the Biennale in Venice / Italy in June 2009. Moana & the Tribe launched songs from their 5th album Rima in 2014 at Womad NZ.

In 2014, Moana and her band formed the Boomerang Collaboration with Scottish band Breabach, Shellie Morris, Casey Donovan and Djakapurra, playing concerts at Womad NZ, Sydney Opera House and HebCelt (Scotland). Rima was a finalist at the 2015 Vodafone NZ Music Awards and the song "Upokohue" was a finalist in the APRA Maioha Award. It won 2nd place in the World category at the International Songwriting Contest.

Other activities
Moana is one half of an award-winning film-making team led by her partner and band member Toby Mills. Their documentary work includes Guarding the Family Silver, which screened in the National Geographic All Roads Film Festival and The Russians are Coming, which played at the Sydney Opera House during the Message Sticks Indigenous Film Festival in 2012.

She is also a regular writer for the Māori and Pacific online weekly newspaper e-tangata.

Moana is the presenter of the weekly current affairs television program Te Ao with Moana, which broadcasts at 8 pm every Monday on Māori Television and is currently in its third series.

Recognition
Moana won the grand prize at the 2003 International Songwriting Competition with her song "Moko". In 2003, New Zealand Herald described Moana's music as "music of great depth and beauty".

In the 2004 Queen's Birthday Honours, Moana was appointed a Member of the New Zealand Order of Merit, for services to Māori and music. She is also a Life Time Recipient of the Toi Iho Māori Made Mark and received the 2005 Te Tohu Mahi Hou a Te Waka Toi Award from Te Waka Toi (Creative N.Z.), in recognition of her outstanding leadership and contribution to the development of new directions in Māori art. Moana received a Music Industry Award at the Maori Waiata 2008 Awards, also for her positive contribution to Māori Music.

Discography

Studio albums

Compilation albums

Extended plays

Singles

Awards

Aotearoa Music Awards
The Aotearoa Music Awards (previously known as New Zealand Music Awards (NZMA)) are an annual awards night celebrating excellence in New Zealand music and have been presented annually since 1965.

! 
|-
|rowspan="2"| 1987 || Moana - "Kua Makona" || Polynesian of the Year ||  ||rowspan="15"| 
|-
| Moana || Most Promising Female||  
|-
|1988 || Moana Moahunters|| Polynesian of the Year||  
|-
|rowspan="2"| 1989 || Moana & The Moa Hunters - "Pupurutia" || Polynesian of the Year||  
|-
| Moana Jackson || Female of the Year ||  
|-
|rowspan="4"|1992 || Moana & The Moa Hunters - "A.E.I.O.U." || Māori of the Year||  
|-
| Moana Jackson || Female of the Year ||  
|-
| Teremoana Rapley - Moana & The Moa Hunters/MC OJ || Most Promising Female ||  
|-
| Moana & The Moa Hunters - "A.E.I.O.U." || Music Video of the Year ||  
|-
|rowspan="2"|1996 || Moana and The Moahunters - "Give it Up Now" || Mana Māori of the Year||  
|-
| Moana and The Moahunters - "Akona te Reo '95" || Mana Reo ||  
|-
|rowspan="2"|1999 || Moana and The Moahunters - Rua || Mana Māori of the Year||  
|-
| Moana and The Moahunters - Rua || Mana Reo ||  
|-
| 2008 || Moana & the Tribe - Wha || Māori of the Year||  
|-
| 2015 || Moana & the Tribe - Rima || Māori of the Year||  
|-
| 2016 || Moana || New Zealand Music Hall of Fame ||  || 
|-

References

External links 
 Moana Maniapoto at NZ On Screen
 

1961 births
Living people
21st-century New Zealand women singers
New Zealand Māori women singers
Members of the New Zealand Order of Merit
20th-century New Zealand women singers
People educated at St Joseph's Māori Girls' College
New Zealand former Christians
Former Roman Catholics
Māori-language singers
Jackson family (New Zealand)
People educated at John Paul College, Rotorua